A box gutter, internal gutter, parallel gutter, or trough gutter is a rain gutter on a roof usually rectangular in shape; it may be lined with EPDM rubber, metal, asphalt, or roofing felt, and may be concealed behind a parapet or the eaves, or in a roof valley.

Box gutters are essentially placed between parallel surfaces, as in a valley between parallel roofs or at the junction of a roof and a parapet wall. They should not be confused with so-called valley gutters or valley flashings which occur at the non-parallel intersection of roof surfaces, typically at right angled internal corners of pitched roofs. Provision is made in the design of the gutter to have a rain flow to the outlet with a maximum slope of 1:200 and a minimum of 1:400.

Gallery of sketches
Note! The sketches in this section reference terminology commonly used in the UK and Australia.

References

External links
An Illustrated glossary of roofs and roofing terms.

Architectural elements
Roofs